The Mirage is a 1924 American silent comedy film directed by George Archainbaud and starring Florence Vidor. It was adapted from the 1920 play of the same name by Edgar Selwyn.

Cast
Florence Vidor as Irene Martin
Clive Brook as Henry Galt
Alan Roscoe as Al Manning
Vola Vale as Betty Bond
Myrtle Vane as Mrs. Martin
Charlotte Stevens as Irene's Sister

Preservation
With no copies of The Mirage located in any film archives, it is a lost film.

References

External links

1924 films
American silent feature films
Lost American films
Films directed by George Archainbaud
Producers Distributing Corporation films
American black-and-white films
Silent American comedy films
1924 comedy films
1924 lost films
Lost comedy films
1920s American films
1920s English-language films